Blair Vincent Adams (born 8 September 1991) is an English professional footballer who plays as a left back for South Shields. His professional career dates back to 2010 since which time he has played with teams including Brentford, Northampton Town, Coventry City, Mansfield Town, Cambridge United, and Gateshead. Over his career he has made almost 200 game appearances.

Career
Adams graduated from Sunderland's academy in summer 2010. He was given the squad number 34 during his first professional season and was the reserves' leading appearance-maker in 2010–11, playing 24 games.

On 8 September 2011, Adams moved to Brentford on loan until 7 December and on 5 October, he scored his first ever professional goal against Charlton Athletic in the Football League Trophy. With seven appearances, Adams return to Sunderland from a loan spell.

On 2 January 2012 Adams moved on loan to Northampton Town. At the end of January, Adams loan spell at Northampton was extended by another month His loan spells was soon extended twice, leading another one until the end of the season

On 17 November 2012, he moved to Coventry City on loan. On the same day, Adams made his debut, setting up a goal for Carl Baker, in a 5–0 win over Hartlepool United. On 8 December 2012, Adams scored an own goal but Coventry went on to win 5–1. This loan was made permanent on 17 January 2013. Two days after making his move permanent, Adams played his first match in a 2–0 win over Oldham Athletic.

Adams and Coventry mutually parted ways at the end of the 2013–14 season, later signing with League One club Notts County.

In October 2015 Adams joined Mansfield Town on a one-month loan. On 17 November 2015, his loan contract has extended until 19 January 2016.

After a spell with Cambridge United, Adams signed for Scottish Premiership club Hamilton Academical in January 2017. He was released by Hamilton at the end of the 2016–17 season.

After a brief period at Hartlepool United Adams was announced as a new signing for his hometown club, South Shields on 27th July 2018. On his 27th birthday, 8 September, he scored a hat-trick in a FA Cup qualifying match against Garforth Town that ended 5–1. On 12 January 2021, Adams joined National League North side Gateshead on an initial 28-day loan deal.

Career statistics

References

External links

1991 births
Living people
Footballers from South Shields
English footballers
England youth international footballers
Association football defenders
Sunderland A.F.C. players
Brentford F.C. players
Northampton Town F.C. players
Coventry City F.C. players
Notts County F.C. players
Mansfield Town F.C. players
Cambridge United F.C. players
English Football League players
Hamilton Academical F.C. players
Hartlepool United F.C. players
South Shields F.C. (1974) players
Gateshead F.C. players